Sir Edmund George Felix Paston-Bedingfeld, 9th Baronet (2 June 1915 – 24 May 2011) was a landowner and British Army officer.

Background
Paston-Bedingfield was born to Major Sir Henry Edward Paston-Bedingfeld, 8th Bt. and Sybil Lyne-Stephens.

He was educated at The Oratory School and at New College, Oxford. As a Major in the Welsh Guards Regiment, he served in north-west Europe in 1940, and from 1944 to 1945, and was mentioned in despatches. He was a member of the London Guards' Club. He succeeded to the baronetcy in 1941.

Marriages
He first married Joan Lynette Rees, daughter of Edgar Rees, of Lwyneithin, Llanelly, Wales, on 6 June 1942; they had a son, Henry, and a daughter, Alexandra Winifred Mary (born 3 September 1947), but divorced in 1952 on the grounds of his adultery. Five years later, he married, secondly, Agnes Kathleen Susan Anne Gluck, daughter of Miklos Gluck (of Budapest), on 31 May 1957. He married, thirdly, on 20 November 1975, and, lastly, to Sheila, daughter of John Douglas, on 15 February 1992.

Death
A major Norfolk landowner and Lord of the Manor of Oxborough, he died on 24 May 2011 at age 95 at Bury St. Edmunds, Suffolk, and was succeeded by his son Henry, who has retired as Norroy and Ulster King of Arms.

References

External links

 Profile, Cracroftspeerage.com; accessed 28 July 2015.

1915 births
2011 deaths
Baronets in the Baronetage of England
British Army personnel of World War II
People from Breckland District
Welsh Guards officers